New Hope may refer to:

Places

United States
 New Hope, Alabama
 New Hope, Arkansas (disambiguation)
 New Hope, Florida
 New Hope, Early County, Georgia 
 New Hope, Paulding County, Georgia 
 New Hope, Illinois
 New Hope, Indiana
 New Hope, Warrick County, Indiana
 New Hope, Kentucky, in Nelson County, Kentucky
 New Hope, Minnesota
 New Hope, Mississippi
 New Hope, Missouri
 New Hope, North Carolina (disambiguation), several places
 New Hope, Brown County, Ohio
 New Hope, Preble County, Ohio
 New Hope, Pennsylvania
 New Hope, Tennessee  
 New Hope, Texas, in Collin County
 New Hope, Cherokee County, Texas
 New Hope, Henderson County, Texas
 New Hope, Smith County, Texas
 New Hope, Sunnyvale, Texas, in Dallas County
 New Hope, Virginia (disambiguation), several places
 New Hope, West Virginia (disambiguation), several places
 New Hope, Wisconsin, a town
 New Hope (community), Wisconsin, an unincorporated community
 New Hope Creek, a waterway in central North Carolina
 New Hope Valley
 New Hope Rosenwald School, listed on the National Register of Historic Places near Fredonia, Alabama

Organisations
 New Hope Coal, an Australian coal mining company
 New Hope (Macau), a political party in Macau
 New Hope (Israel), a political party in Israel
 New Hope (Poland), a political party in Poland formerly known as KORWiN

United States
 New Hope Academy, a private school in Landover Hills, Prince George's County, Maryland
 New Hope Christian Fellowship, Honolulu, Hawaii
 New Hope Christian Schools, Oregon

Other uses
 Star Wars Episode IV: A New Hope, a Star Wars film
 NewHope, a post-quantum cryptography algorithm
 New Hope and Ivyland Railroad, a railroad tourist attraction in New Hope, Pennsylvania
 New Hope Valley Railway, a small train ride in North Carolina
 The New Hope, later name of The Kit Kats, an American rock band

See also
 New Hope High School (disambiguation)
 New Hope School (disambiguation)
 A New Hope (disambiguation)